The 2017 St. Francis Brooklyn Terriers men's soccer team represent St. Francis College during the 2017 NCAA Division I men's soccer season. The Terrier's home games are played at Brooklyn Bridge Park, Pier 5. The team has been a member of the Northeast Conference since 1981 and is coached by Tom Giovatto, who was in his eleventh year at the helm of the Terriers.

Going into the season, the Teriers were unanimously picked by the NEC's head coaches to defend its crown in 2017. The Terriers ended their season at 14–5–1 overall and  6–0–1 in conference play. The Terriers won the NEC Regular season championship and the Tournament Championship.

2017 squad

As of August 21, 2017.

   

   

  

    

    

  
  

           

 

Captains in bold

Schedule

Non-conference

Northeast Conference

Northeast conference tournament

NCAA Division I Men's Soccer Championship

NSCAA/Continental Tire College rankings

Awards
Faouzi Taieb, Sophomore Defender
2017 NEC Defender of the Year
Selected to the 2017 NEC First Team All-Conference
Selected to the 2017 NEC Men’s Soccer All-Tournament Team
Selected 2017 Third team All-American by College Soccer News

Ali Tounkara, Junior Forward
Selected to the 2017 NEC All-Rookie Team
Selected to the 2017 NEC Men’s Soccer All-Tournament Team
2017 NEC Tournament MVP

Dominic Falanga, Senior Midfielder
NEC Player of the Week Award (October 16 – 22)
Selected to the 2017 NEC First Team All-Conference
Selected to the 2017 NEC Men’s Soccer All-Tournament Team  

Nadim Saqui, Senior Forward
NEC Player of the Week Award (October 30 – November 5)
Selected to the 2017 NEC Men’s Soccer All-Tournament Team 

Collyns Laokandi, Senior Defender 
Selected to the 2017 NEC First Team All-Conference

Robert Bazzichetto, Senior Goalkeeper
Selected to the 2017 NEC First Team All-Conference

Chris Gruver, Freshman Forward
NEC Rookie of the Week Award (October 16 – 22)

Federico Curbelo, Senior Midfielder
Selected to the 2017 NEC Second Team All-Conference

Leo Folla, Senior Defender
Selected to the 2017 NEC Second Team All-Conference

Matteo Caribotti, Sophomore Forward
Selected to the 2017 NEC Team All-Rookie Team

Sami Gliguem, Junior Midfielder
Selected to the 2017 NEC Team All-Rookie Team

Season statistics

See also 

 St. Francis Brooklyn Terriers men's soccer
 2017 NCAA Division I men's soccer season
 Northeast Conference Men's Soccer Tournament
 2017 NCAA Division I Men's Soccer Championship

References 

St. Francis Brooklyn Terriers
St. Francis Brooklyn Terriers men's soccer seasons
St. Francis Brooklyn Terriers
St. Francis Brooklyn Terriers